Doremus House may refer to:

Doremus House (Hackensack, New Jersey), listed on the National Register of Historic Places in Bergen County, New Jersey
Cornelius Doremus House, Montville, New Jersey, listed on the National Register of Historic Places in Morris County, New Jersey as the Parsonage of the Montville Reformed Dutch Church
Henry Doremus House, Towaco, New Jersey, listed on the National Register of Historic Places in Morris County, New Jersey